Robert Solwin Smith (1924 New York City – May 22, 2013 McLean, Virginia) was a non-career appointee who served as the American Ambassador Extraordinary and Plenipotentiary to the Côte d'Ivoire from 1974 to 1976 and vice president of the Overseas Private Investment Corp.

He left Yale University to serve in the Navy during World War II. Smith returned to Yale, graduating in 1947. He received a master's degree in 1949 and a doctorate in 1956, both in government, at Harvard University.

Smith died at his home due to complications from melanoma.

References

Ambassadors of the United States to Ivory Coast
Yale University alumni
Harvard University alumni
1924 births
Date of birth missing
2013 deaths
United States Navy personnel of World War II
Deaths from melanoma
People from New York City
People from McLean, Virginia
American business executives
20th-century American military personnel